Trevor Matthew Spangenberg (born April 21, 1991) is an American professional soccer player who plays as a goalkeeper for Birmingham Legion.

Career

Early career
Spangenberg played five years of college soccer at Missouri State University between 2009 and 2013, including a red-shirted year in 2009. While at college, Spangenberg appeared for USL PDL club Laredo Heat in 2010 and Springfield Demize in 2012 and 2013.

Chivas USA
On March 9, 2014, Spangenberg signed with Major League Soccer club Chivas USA.

New England Revolution
Following the dissolution of Chivas USA, Spangenberg signed with the New England Revolution ahead of the 2015 season. He was then sent on loan to the Richmond Kickers, a USL team who is partners with MLS club D.C. United. Spangenberg was released by New England at the end of their 2015 season.

Puerto Rico FC
Spangenberg became the second goalkeeper signed by NASL expansion club Puerto Rico FC on April 6, 2016.

After 10 matches in the 2016 fall season Trevor Spangenberg was given the chance to start at goalie against the league leaders FC Edmonton on the road. He and the team was able to keep the game scoreless. After a spectacular performance against Miami FC the job was his to keep. The 25-year-old keeper had a goals allowed average of 1.2 and five shut outs in 12 starts.

On January 23, 2017, Puerto Rico FC announced the return of five regulars from the 2016 starting XI. Spangenberg performances towards the end of the season led to his option being picked up by the Club. He was released at the end of the 2017 season.

Richmond Kickers
On February 28, 2018, Spangenberg signed with USL side Richmond Kickers for the 2018 season.

Career statistics

References

External links
 

1991 births
Living people
American soccer players
Association football goalkeepers
Chivas USA players
Laredo Heat players
Major League Soccer players
New England Revolution players
Puerto Rico FC players
Richmond Kickers players
Birmingham Legion FC players
Soccer players from Arizona
Sportspeople from Mesa, Arizona
Springfield Demize players
USL Championship players
USL League Two players